Lansdowne Road railway station is a railway station in Dublin, Ireland. The station serves the Ballsbridge and Upper Baggot Street areas of Dublin 4.

Facilities and services 
The station has two through platforms, 1 and 2, connected via a subway. Both have separate entrances as there is a level crossing adjacent to the station on Lansdowne Road. There are automated ticket vending machines at both entrances. When there is an event at the stadium, additional entrances are opened to allow for crowd control.

All DART services serve the station, as do several South Eastern Commuter (Dublin Connolly to Gorey) services.

History
The station was adjacent to its namesake Lansdowne Road Stadium before the stadium was torn down in 2007 and replaced on-site by the new Aviva Stadium, which the station now serves. It has level access to both platforms. The ticket office is open between 06:00-00:00 AM, Monday to Sunday.

The station opened on 1 July 1870. It was electrified in 1983 with the arrival of DART services.

Gallery

See also
 List of railway stations in Ireland

References

External links

 Irish Rail Lansdowne Road Station Website

Sandymount
Ballsbridge
Iarnród Éireann stations in Dublin (city)
Railway stations opened in 1870
1870 establishments in Ireland
Railway stations in the Republic of Ireland opened in the 19th century